Jagasiram Jagmalram Koli is an Indian Politician, Social Worker and incumbent four-time Member of the Rajasthan Legislative Assembly for Reodar constituency in Rajasthan, India. Jagasi Ram Koli belong to the Bhartiya Janata Party. In 2018 general elections he beat Neeraj Dangi of Indian National Congress by a margin of 14604 votes.

Other Minor posts 
 Member of Committee on Welfare of Schedule Caste (2014-2015)
 Member of Committee on Welfare of Schedule Caste (2015-2016)
 Member of Committee on Welfare of Schedule Caste (2016-2017)
 Member of Committee on Welfare of Schedule Caste (2017-2018)

References 

Bharatiya Janata Party politicians from Rajasthan
Rajasthan MLAs 2018–2023
1967 births
Living people
People from Sirohi district
Rajasthan MLAs 2003–2008
Rajasthan MLAs 2008–2013
Rajasthan MLAs 2013–2018